Daniel William Coquillett (23 January 1856, Pleasant Valley, Ill. – 7 July 1911 Atlantic City, New Jersey) was an American entomologist who specialised in Diptera. He wrote a revision of the dipterous family Therevidae and many other scientific papers in which he described many new species and genera of Diptera. Coquillett was also the first to attempt fumigation with hydrocyanic acid as a means for controlling citrus scale insects. He experimented in the Wolfskill orange groves where he was supported by the foreman and later quarantine entomologist Alexander Craw in 1888–89.

References

External links
Archive Digitised  Coquillett, D. W. Report on the locusts of the San Joaquin valley, Cal. Anaheim, Calif.Date 1886
Archive Digitised Coquillet, D. W. (Diptera) Papers from the Hopkins-Stanford Galapagos expedition, 1898–1899 Volumes 14, 15,16, 17 Washington, D.C., The Academy.
Portrait

American entomologists
Dipterists
1856 births
1911 deaths